Jessica Michel (born 22 June 1982, in Paris) is a French dressage rider.  She competed at the 2012 Summer Olympics in the individual.

References

Living people
1982 births
Sportspeople from Paris
French female equestrians
Olympic equestrians of France
Equestrians at the 2012 Summer Olympics